Small Teen, Bigger World was a four-part documentary following the life of a teenager with dwarfism, Jasmine Burkitt (full name Jasmine Emily Wakefield-Burkitt), and details her family and life. It was the second series to follow Jasmine's life, following the hour-long documentary Small Teen, Big World, which aired in July 2010. Small Teen, Bigger World aired during the summer of 2011, and was part of the 'Extraordinary Me' season on BBC Three.

Background
Jasmine Emily Burkitt (known as Jazz) had restricted growth, but despite being only the height of an average nine-year-old, she was determined to live a normal teenage life. Although she was only , Jasmine had never let her size get in her way. From the age of 13, she  cared for her mum, who also had restricted growth. Jasmine stated that a key reason behind taking part in the documentary was for people to treat her as they would any other teenager, as opposed to "treating her like a doll and wanting to treat her like a baby".

Jasmine Burkitt published a biography: Growing Pains: The Inspirational True Story of a Small Girl with Big Dreams (1999, Ebury).

Beverley Burkitt died at Glan Clwyd Hospital on 28 December 2013, at the age of 50. Jasmine Burkitt died on 27 June 2022 at the age of 28. Her fiancé, Lewis Burke, announced her death on Facebook saying that "after a life long battle with a very serious mental illness, Jasmine has passed away".

Small Teen, Big World

As part of BBC Three's Adult Season, Small Teen, Big World aired on 27 July 2010 – it is a one-hour long documentary detailing the life of Burkitt and her family. It was watched by 1.1 million viewers, the largest multichannel audience of the night. It also aired on BBC One on 9 September 2010, attracting 2.76 million viewers.

The programme shows Jasmine at home with mum Beverley, and her grandparents Norman and Margaret, as well as out shopping with her best friend Naomi in Llandudno. It reveals what it's like living with her condition while coping with the pressures of teenage life and caring for her mother, who also has respiratory problems. In the run-up to her 16th birthday Jazz is preparing not only to attend the Little People of America convention in New York City, but also to leave north Wales for the south of England, and meet her real father for the first time. While in New York, she meets others who share her condition and who have been attending the conference for years, some of whom have met future partners and fallen in love.

Episodes
Due to the success of Small Teen, Big World, BBC Three commissioned a four-part series following Jasmine and her family – entitled Small Teen, Bigger World, which was part of BBC Three's 'Extraordinary Me' season during the summer of 2011. The series consisted of four episodes, airing between 11 July 2011 and 1 August 2011, each episode running for the duration of an hour.

References

External links

BBC television documentaries
2011 British television series debuts
Documentary films about adolescence
Documentary films about people with disability
Works about dwarfism